Sir David Rippon Hare  is an English playwright, screenwriter and theatre and film director. Best known for his stage work, Hare has also enjoyed great success with films, receiving two Academy Award nominations for Best Adapted Screenplay for writing The Hours in 2002, based on the novel written by Michael Cunningham, and The Reader in 2008, based on the novel of the same name written by Bernhard Schlink.

In the West End, he had his greatest success with the plays Plenty (1978), which he adapted into a 1985 film starring Meryl Streep, Racing Demon (1990), Skylight (1997), and Amy's View (1998). The four plays ran on Broadway in 1982–83, 1996, 1998 and 1999 respectively, earning Hare three Tony Award nominations for Best Play for the first three and two Laurence Olivier Awards for Best New Play. Other notable projects on stage include A Map of the World, Pravda (starring Anthony Hopkins at the National Theatre in London), Murmuring Judges, The Absence of War, The Vertical Hour, and his latest play Straight Line Crazy starring Ralph Fiennes. He wrote screenplays for films including the Stephen Daldry dramas The Hours (2002) and The Reader (2008) and BBC's Page Eight (2011) and Netflix's Collateral (2018).

In addition to his two Academy Award nominations, Hare has received three Golden Globe Award nominations, three Tony Award nominations and has won a BAFTA Award, a Writers Guild of America Award for Best Adapted Screenplay and two Laurence Olivier Awards. He has also been awarded several critics' awards such as the New York Drama Critics Circle Award and received the Golden Bear in 1985.

Early life
David Hare was born and raised – first in a flat, then in a semi-detached house – in St Leonards-on-Sea, Hastings, Sussex, the son of Agnes Cockburn (née Gilmour) and Clifford Theodore Rippon Hare, a passenger ship's purser in the Merchant Navy. The Hare family claimed descent from the Earls of Bristol. Hare was educated at Lancing College, an independent school in Sussex, and at Jesus College, Cambridge (MA (Cantab.), English Literature). While at Cambridge he was the Hiring Manager on the Cambridge University Amateur Dramatic Club Committee in 1968.

Career

Early work 
Hare worked with the Portable Theatre Company from 1968 to 1971. His first play, Slag, was produced in 1970, the same year in which he married his first wife, Margaret Matheson; the couple had three children and divorced in 1980. He was Resident Dramatist at the Royal Court Theatre, London, from 1970 to 1971, and in 1973 became resident dramatist at the Nottingham Playhouse. He co-founded the Joint Stock Theatre Company with David Aukin and Max Stafford-Clark in 1975. Hare's play Plenty was produced at the National Theatre in 1978. 
Aside from films he has also written teleplays such as, for the BBC,  Licking Hitler (1978), and, for Thames Television, Saigon: Year of the Cat (1983).

1980s 
Hare founded a film company called Greenpoint Films in 1982, and has written screenplays such as Plenty, Wetherby, Strapless, and Paris by Night. In 1983 his play A Map of the World in 1983 was produced at the Royal National Theatre. The production starred Bill Nighy, Diana Quick, and Ronald Hines. The play is set at the Unesco conference on poverty held in Bombay in 1978. It transferred to The Public Theatre in 1985 starring Alfre Woodard, Elizabeth McGovern, and Zeljko Ivanek. In a mixed review The New York Times theatre critic Frank Rich wrote, "The play is in part about conflicting points of view - about how reactionaries and leftists look at geopolitics, how journalists and novelists look at events and how the West and the Third World look at each other."

In 1985, Hare wrote Pravda with Howard Brenton, its title refers to the Russian Communist party newspaper Pravda. The play, a satire on the mid-1980s newspaper industry, in particular the Australian media and press baron Rupert Murdoch, stars Anthony Hopkins in a role which earned him the Laurence Olivier Award. Hare became the Associate Director of the National Theatre in 1984, and has since seen many of his plays produced, such as his trilogy of plays about major British institutions Racing Demon, Murmuring Judges, and The Absence of War. He has also directed many other plays aside from his own works, such as The Pleasure Principle by Snoo Wilson, Weapons of Happiness by Howard Brenton, and King Lear by William Shakespeare for the National Theatre. He is also the author of a collection of lectures on the arts and politics called Obedience, Struggle, and Revolt (2005).

1990s 
In 1990, Hare wrote Racing Demon, part of a trio of plays about British institutions, it focuses on the Church of England, and tackles issues such as gay ordination, and the role of evangelism in inner-city communities. The play debuted at the National Theatre and received the Laurence Olivier Award for Best New Play. The play transferred to the Broadway stage at the Vivian Beaumont Theatre in 1995. The production starred Paul Giamatti, Denis O'Hare, and Kathleen Chalfant. The play was nominated for the Tony Award for Best Play. In 1996, Hare wrote Skylight, a play about a woman who receives an unexpected visit from her former lover whose wife has recently died. Michael Gambon and Lia Williams starred in the original production which received the Laurence Olivier Award for Best New Play. The following year it transferred to the Broadway stage where it was nominated for the Tony Award for Best Play. 

Hare wrote Amy's View in 1998, a play which deals with an emotional relationship between a mother and her daughter. The original production at the Royal National Theatre starred Judi Dench, Samantha Bond, and Ronald Pickup. Dench starred in the Broadway transfer earning the Tony Award for Best Actress in a Play.

2000s 
In 2001, Hare wrote, My Zinc Bed which premiered at the Royal Court Theatre starring Tom Wilkinson, Julia Ormond, and Steven Mackintosh. The play was adapted into a television film of the same name in 2008. The play received the Laurence Olivier Award for Best New Play nomination, Hare's eighth Olivier award nomination. The following year Hare wrote the screenplay for The Hours (2002) adapted from the Michael Cunningham book of the same name. The film starred an ensemble cast including Meryl Streep, Julianne Moore, and Nicole Kidman as women from three different time periods struggling against adversity. He received the Academy Award for Best Adapted Screenplay nomination as well as BAFTA Award, Golden Globe Award nominations. 

In 2008, he adapted Bernhard Schlink's 1995 novel into Stephen Daldry's film The Reader starring Kate Winslet and Ralph Fiennes. The film focuses on a romance in the 1950s between a teenaged boy and an older woman who is later discovered to have been a Nazi guard and is on trial for committing war crimes during the Holocaust. The film was well reviewed and earned Hare his second Academy Award nomination. He also received BAFTA and Golden Globe Award nominations as well.

2010s 
In December 2011, it was announced that his monologue Wall about the Israeli West Bank barrier was being adapted by Cam Christiansen as a live-action/animated documentary by the National Film Board of Canada; originally slated for completed in 2014, Wall premiered at the Calgary International Film Festival in 2017. In November 2012, The New School for Drama selected Hare as temporary Artist-in-residence in which he met with student playwrights about his experience in varying mediums. His career is examined in the Reputations strand on TheatreVoice. He is particularly well known for incisive commentary on the problems of public institutions. Raymond Williams once said, sardonically, that the public services are largely managed by the nation's "upper servants". Hare addresses this group, providing an analysis of the workings of the institutions: he is, he has said, interested in the struggle to make procedures work better - right now - not in waiting until some revolution, somehow, sometime, comes about to raze the current system altogether, to replace it with perfection.

In 2016, Hare wrote the screenplay for Denial based on Deborah Lipstadt's History on Trial: My Day in Court with a Holocaust Denier. The film starred Tom Wilkinson, Rachel Weisz, and Timothy Spall. The film dramatises the Irving v Penguin Books Ltd case, in which Lipstadt, a Holocaust scholar, was sued by Holocaust denier David Irving for libel. The film premiered at the Toronto International Film Festival to positive reviews. It later received the BAFTA Award for Outstanding British Film nomination.

2020s 
In 2020, he contracted COVID-19, an experience reflected in his monologue Beat the Devil with Ralph Fiennes in the starring role. In 2022, he wrote, Straight Line Crazy. The play is set in the 1920s through the 1960s in New York City and centres around the life of Robert Moses portrayed by Fiennes. Fiennes stars as Moses, once a powerful man in New York and the "master builder" of infrastructure from new parks, bridges and expressways. During his working life, he served on the New York State Council of Parks and was the New York Secretary of State. The play premiered at the Bridge Theatre in London in March 2022. The play transferred to the New York stage with Fiennes at The Shed in October 2022.

Archive 
In 1993, he sold his archive to the Harry Ransom Center at the University of Texas at Austin. The archive consists of typescript drafts, notes, rehearsal scripts, schedules, production notes, correspondence, theatre programs, resumes, photographs, and published texts associated with Hare's plays, teleplays, screenplays, and essays, as well as foreign-language translations of Hare's works; works by other authors; personal correspondence; minutes of meetings; and Hare's English papers from Cambridge University.

Personal life 
He is married to the French fashion designer Nicole Farhi.

In 1993 Hare's best friend Sarah Matheson was diagnosed with Multiple System Atrophy and died from the disease in 1999. In January 2015, Hare broadcast the BBC Radio 4 Appeal to raise money for the Multiple System Atrophy Trust, which was founded by Matheson.

Works 

Selected credits

Theatre 

Slag (1970)
The Great Exhibition (1972)
Brassneck (1973) (with Howard Brenton)
Knuckle (1974)
Fanshen (1975). Based on Fanshen (1966)
Teeth 'n' Smiles (1975)
Plenty (1978)
A Map of the World (1982)
Pravda (1985) (with Howard Brenton)
The Bay at Nice, and Wrecked Eggs (1986)
The Knife (1987) (with Nick Bicat and Tim Rose Price)
The Secret Rapture (1988)
Racing Demon (1990)
Murmuring Judges (1991)
The Absence of War (1993)
Skylight (1995)
Amy's View (1997)
Ivanov (1997; 2015) (adapted from Chekhov)
The Blue Room (1998) (adapted from Schnitzler)
The Judas Kiss (1998)
Via Dolorosa (1998)
My Zinc Bed (2000)
Platonov (2001; 2015) (adapted from Chekhov)
The Breath of Life (2002)
The Permanent Way (2003)
Stuff Happens (2004)
The Vertical Hour (2006)
Gethsemane (2008)
Berlin (2009)
Wall (2009)
The Power of Yes (2009)
South Downs (2011)
Behind the Beautiful Forevers (2014) 
The Seagull (2015) (adapted from Chekhov)
The Moderate Soprano (2015)
The Red Barn (2016) 
I'm Not Running (2018)
Beat the Devil (2020)
Straight Line Crazy (2022)

Film 

Plenty (1985) 
Damage (1992)
The Secret Rapture (1993)
The Hours (2002)
The Reader (2008) 
Denial (2016)
Wall (2017)
The White Crow (2018)

Television 

Page Eight (BBC, 2011) (also directed)
Turks & Caicos (BBC, 2014) (also directed)
Salting the Battlefield (BBC, 2014) (also directed)
Collateral (Netflix, 2018)
Roadkill (BBC One, 2020)
Beat the Devil (Showtime/Skyarts, 2021)

Awards and honours

For his work in theatre he has received eight Laurence Olivier Award nominations, winning the award twice, for Racing Demon in 1990 and Skylight in 1996. He has also received three Tony Award nominations for Plenty in 1985, Racing Demon in 1996 and Skylight in 1997. He aldo received the John Llewellyn Rhys Prize (1975), a BAFTA Award (1979), the New York Drama Critics Circle Award (1983), and the London Theatre Critics' Award (1990).

Hare has received various award nominations for his film work, including two Academy Award nominations for The Hours (2002), and The Reader (2008); two Golden Globe Award nominations; and five BAFTA Award nominations. He was awarded the Berlin Film Festival Golden Bear in 1985. In 1997, he was a member of the jury at the 47th Berlin International Film Festival. 

He has also received various honours including knighthoods, degrees, and fellows. He was elected a Fellow of the Royal Society of Literature in 1985. This gave him the Post Nominal Letters "FRSL" for Life. He was awarded an Honorary Fellowship by Jesus College, Cambridge in 2001. He was knighted in the 1998 Queen's Birthday Honours List "For services to the Theatre". This allows him to use the title Sir. He was awarded the Honorary degree of Doctor of Letters (D.Litt) by the University of East Anglia in 2010.

References

External links 

 David Hare Papers and Additions to His Papers at the Harry Ransom Center
 
 
 
David Hare - contributor page at The New York Review of Books

1947 births
20th-century English dramatists and playwrights
21st-century English dramatists and playwrights
Alumni of Jesus College, Cambridge
BAFTA winners (people)
Directors of Golden Bear winners
Fellows of the Royal Society of Literature
Knights Bachelor
Living people
People educated at Lancing College
Laurence Olivier Award winners
People from Hastings
Writers Guild of America Award winners
John Llewellyn Rhys Prize winners
Fellows of the American Academy of Arts and Sciences
English screenwriters
English male screenwriters
English male dramatists and playwrights
English republicans